HMS Moth was an  of the Royal Navy. Entering service in 1916, Moth had a varied career with service in the Middle East, the White Sea and the Far East in two world wars. The ship remained active throughout the war, before striking a naval mine in the Yangtze River in 1945 and sinking.

Moth was laid down during the first half of 1915 at the yards of the Sunderland Shipbuilding Company, with her sister ship . Moth was launched on 9 October 1915 and completed on 5 January 1916.

Service history

Royal Navy service
Moth was dispatched to the Middle East (Mesopotamia area) in 1916. In 1919, she was dispatched to the White Sea, and by 1920 she had been reassigned to the China Station. Her edited logbooks and maps of her journeys for 1919 and 1920 can be viewed at naval-history.net. On 8 December 1941, Moth and Cicala were in port during an air raid by the Imperial Japanese Army Air Force. Cicala was sunk on 21 December. Moth was in the dock for repairs, but with the fall of the city to the Japanese imminent, Moth was scuttled on 12 December.

Imperial Japanese Navy service

Suma is a Japanese beauty spot appearing in The Tale of Genji.

On 29 July 1943 she fired on US aircraft during an air raid on Hong Kong. Suma was attacked by three 14th Air Force B-25s on 29 December 1943, and by two B-25s the next day receiving some damage, while claiming to kill one B-25. On 11 June 1944, the ship was attacked by P-38s and on 18 June, by three B-25s. On 26 December Suma was attacked by seven P-51s, with the aft 25 mm gun wrecked and 18 killed and four wounded. The aft gun was replaced and repairs made to the ship 28–30 December at Yanhu.

Suma was attacked by P-51s on 11 February 1945. The ship was repaired at Mitsubishi Yangshupu Shipyard, Shanghai from 17 February to 12 March 1945. She was active on the Yangtze River in anti-insurgency operations. On 19 March 1945, she struck a naval mine at Anqing and sank with a loss of 8 crewmen.

Notes

References 
 
 , History of Pacific War Vol.45 Truth histories of the Imperial Japanese Naval Vessels, Gakken (Japan), May 2004, 

 

Insect-class gunboats
Naval ships of the United Kingdom captured by Japan during World War II
1915 ships
Maritime incidents in December 1941
Maritime incidents in March 1945
Ships sunk by mines
Suma